Mark Platt (born 29 March 1973) is a Canadian rower. He competed in the men's eight event at the 1996 Summer Olympics.

References

External links
 

1973 births
Living people
Canadian male rowers
Olympic rowers of Canada
Rowers at the 1996 Summer Olympics
Sportspeople from Peterborough, Ontario
Pan American Games medalists in rowing
Pan American Games silver medalists for Canada
Rowers at the 1995 Pan American Games